Anoba trigonoides is a species of moth of the  family Erebidae. It is found in South America and Central America, including Costa Rica, Paraguay and Brazil.

External links
A review of the subfamily Anobinae with the description of a new species of Baniana Walker from North and Central America (Lepidoptera, Erebidae, Anobinae)

Anobinae
Moths of Central America
Moths of South America